Pseudomonas jinjuensis is a Gram-negative, non-spore-forming, motile, single polar flagellated, yellow-white, rod bacterium isolated from soil in the Jinju Region of Korea. The type strain is LMG 21317.

References

External links
Type strain of Pseudomonas jinjuensis at BacDive -  the Bacterial Diversity Metadatabase

Pseudomonadales
Bacteria described in 2003